Camptoceras hirasei is a species of air-breathing freshwater snails with sinistral shells, aquatic pulmonate gastropod mollusks in the family Planorbidae. This species is endemic to Japan.

References

Planorbidae
Molluscs of Japan
Gastropods described in 1919
Taxonomy articles created by Polbot